Craft in America, Inc. is a 501(c)(3) non-profit organization founded by Carol Sauvion in 2003, and based in Los Angeles, California. Its mission is to document and advance contemporary American craft and traditional craft practices through educational programs in all media. It is dedicated to fostering an appreciation of handmade craft, the makers committed to its practice, and the contribution craft makes to our national cultural heritage.

Its television series Craft in America includes more than 20 hour-long episodes. It is shown on PBS, and is a winner of the Peabody Award. 
In 2020, Craft in America was awarded the inaugural Decorative Arts Trust Prize for Excellence and Innovation, in connection with its plan to create a video dictionary of decorative arts tools, techniques, and materials.

Television series

In 2005, with grants from the Corporation for Public Broadcasting, and the support of private donors, filming began for three one-hour television documentaries on American craft. Craft in America, the Emmy-nominated and Peabody Award-winning PBS television documentary series of the same name premiered in 2007. The twenty second and twenty third episodes aired on December 27, 2019.

Each episode takes viewers inside the homes and studios of skilled makers, who speak of the creative process—in their own words—as finely crafted works emerge from their hands. Thus far, over two hundred artists have been filmed including MacArthur Fellows beadworker Joyce J. Scott, woodworker Sam Maloof, and blacksmith Tom Joyce. Other artists include birch bark basket maker Dona Look, and Mira Nakashima, daughter of furniture maker George Nakashima. Additionally, episodes have highlighted numerous schools and craft institutions committed to advancing and preserving American crafts such as Pilchuck Glass School, Pewabic Pottery, Penland School of Crafts, North Bennet Street School and The Renwick Gallery, Smithsonian American Art Museum. The series is notable for its diversity of native and multi-cultural craft artists as well as more widely recognized practitioners.

The episodes "Borders" and "Neighbors", cross the southern boundary of the United States for the first time to focus on our shared history and influence upon each other. This was an outcome of Craft in America's participation in Pacific Standard Time: LA/LA, the Getty's ambitious exploration of Latin American and Latino art in dialogue with the city of Los Angeles, California. Producer/Director Carol Sauvion describes these episodes as carrying a message about international relations, and cross-cultural exchanges that affirms – that there are no borders in art.

"Borders" takes viewers across the Mexico border, and back again, to explore the connections and influences between Mexican and American craft artists. It visits Mexican master altar maker Ofelia Esparza, the Mexican celebration Day of the Dead, American artist Kiff Slemmons and many others artists forging unique and ongoing cultural exchanges.

"Neighbors" brings viewers across the southern border of the United States to meet Mexican ceramic artists Carlomagno Pedro Martínez, Magdalena Pedro Martínez, and the work of American silver designer William Spratling. It explores the cross-fertilization between Mexican craft artists and their neighboring American craft artists such as muralist Judy Baca and Social and Public Art Resource Center in Venice, California.

Episodes

Additional projects
Additional projects include establishment of the Craft in America Center in Los Angeles, California  to extend the reach of the documentary series by hosting artist talks, curating exhibitions, authoring books, maintaining an archival library of books, magazines, DVDs and video footage on craft, and an extensive website with further information on artists and craft organizations nationwide. The center also provides the Craft in Schools educational outreach program, connecting students to professional artists with hands-on workshops and talks to public, underserved schools in the greater Los Angeles area. Education Guides are linked to each episode for use in classrooms
, and various other resources to further knowledge of crafts, and inspire viewers, artists, researchers and others.

Publications

References

External links
 Official website

Arts organizations based in California
Non-profit organizations based in Los Angeles
2003 establishments in California
Arts organizations established in 2003